James Barriscale (born 11 May 1969) is a British actor, writer and director.

Life and career
Barriscale appeared in the 2019 movie Terminator: Dark Fate. He appeared in an episode of The Alienist (TV series) for Netflix, playing Sgt. Kelly. Barriscale plays The General in Armando Iannucci's period comedy-drama film The Death of Stalin, which chronicles the events that transpired after the death of Joseph Stalin in 1953. Barriscale also stars as Deputy Michaels in Rob Cohen's Action Blockbuster The Hurricane Heist.

Barriscale trained at Bristol Old Vic Theatre School, graduating in 1993, at which point he began his professional career by touring alongside Alan Cumming in a production of Hamlet, directed by Stephen Unwin, with English Touring Theatre (ETT). The production toured the UK before playing at Donmar Warehouse in the West End. From 1994 to 1995, Barriscale was part of Royal Shakespeare Company, with which he appeared in Shakespeare's Twelfth Night, directed by Ian Judge; The Wives Excuse, directed by Max Stafford-Clark; and The Broken Heart, directed by Michael Boyd, all of which were performed at the Stratford-Upon-Avon, Newcastle, and London Seasons, as well as during the Royal Shakespeare Company's brief spell at The Young Vic Theatre.

Barriscale had a starring role as Desk Sergeant John Swift in WPC 56, as well as having undertaken many guest roles in popular television shows, including EastEnders; The Bill – as two different lead guest roles – Vince Foster and latterly The Real Gabriel Kent opposite Todd Carty's psychopathic imposter Gabriel Kent over six episodes which culminated in a live finale; Messiah; Cherished; Banana, for which Barriscale was interviewed by Red Carpet News channel; The Vice; Spooks; A Touch of Frost; Murphy's Law; The Broker's Man and five times in different guest roles in both Casualty and Holby City. In 2007, Barriscale portrayed Princess Diana's bodyguard, Kez Wingfield, in television movie Diana: Last Days of a Princess. Barriscale is a television season regular on popular CBBC show, Wizards vs Aliens, in which he plays Mr Fisher, a science teacher at King's Park High.

In 2007, Barriscale played the role of Duke de la Trémouille in George Bernard Shaw's Saint Joan, directed by Marianne Elliot, at Royal National Theatre. He was invited to stay with The National with their new show War Horse, playing Bone, Carter, Strauss and various other roles during two runs at The National, and then at New London Theatre in the West End, performing more than a thousand performances over a four-year period. Since then, he has appeared on TV as a grieving suspect in Silent Witness. In May 2021, he appeared in the BBC soap opera Doctors as Nathan Sallery.

Voice artist

Since 2008, Barriscale has been a voiceover artist with Hobson's Voices International.

Video games
Roles in video games have included:
 Cassius in Assassin's Creed Origins Sheri, the talking dog, in Professor Layton's Layton's Mystery Journey: Katrielle and the Millionaires Conspiracy
 Bernard Loredo in The Witcher 2: Assassins of Kings Richard Clutterbuck in Assassin's Creed III Various characters in Assassin's Creed IV: Black Flag, Assassin's Creed Unity, Unity Dead Kings and Assassin's Creed Syndicate Mad commentator Franklin in The Last Story A host of characters in Fable III, Killzone 3, and The Adventures of Tin Tin: The Secret of the Unicorn Emile Chillon in Valiant HeartsTV, radio and cinema voice work

Barriscale is a regular voice on Classic FM (UK), and voiced the second season of BBC1's The Sheriffs Are Coming, as well as many adverts on TV, radio and cinema, including Cadbury; Check My File; Esso; Betway; Peugeot; Barclays; HSBC; Knorr, Voltarol and BBC Breaking News

Other work
Barriscale directed One Day'', a 15-minute short film shot on 35mm, starring Tim McInnerny, Tanya Franks and Toby Stephens. It was produced by Stock-pot Productions.

Filmography

References

External links
 



1969 births
Living people
English male voice actors
English male film actors
English male soap opera actors